Centralia Coal Mine is an open-pit coal mine, owned by the Canadian-based TransAlta Corporation. The mine is currently shut down. Together with Centralia Power Plant, it was bought in May 2000 by TransAlta for $554 million – $101 million for the mine and $453 million for the power plant.

The Centralia Coal Mine was Washington state's largest coal mine. The mined coal was supplied exclusively to the adjacent coal-fired Centralia Power Plant, which is operated by TransAlta Centralia Generation LLC and the coal mine was operated by TransAlta Centralia Mining. Prior to May 2000, the mine was owned and operated by PacifiCorp.

The Centralia Mine completed its 31st year of production in 2001, producing  of sub-bituminous coal, 354,481 short tons more than it produced in 2000. The mine's average annual production over 1997–2001 was 4.4 million short tons per year; average annual production over the life of the mine was 4.3 million short tons per year. Officials of TransAlta Centralia were planning to increase annual production at the mine to more than 5 million tons per year and were looking at another 25 years of production from the mine.

Coal production in 2001 at the Centralia Mine came from 4 open pits. Coalbeds mined were the Upper and Lower Thompson, the Big Dirty and Little Dirty seams, and the Smith seam.

These coalbeds are part of the Skookumchuck Rock Formation, which is composed of nearshore marine and nonmarine sedimentary rocks. The Skookumchuck Rock belongs to the upper member of the Eocene Puget Group.

On November 27, 2006, TransAlta stopped operations at the mine, citing increasing operation costs, and is now using coal from the Powder River Basin in Wyoming to supply its power plant.  The mine employed about 600 workers at the time of the closure.  Parts of the mine are currently being reclaimed, with the aim of returning the land to its former forested state.

See also
Tono, Washington

References

Coal mines in the United States
Geology of Washington (state)
Buildings and structures in Lewis County, Washington
Surface mines in the United States
Centralia, Washington
Mines in Washington (state)